James Evans Fuller (June 27, 1947 – March 3, 2017) was the lead guitarist and main songwriter for the 1960s rock band The Surfaris.

Fuller was known as the "Godfather" of surf music, a Californian instrumental music.

He was also a studio musician, and performed on many other artists' such as “The Seeds”, rock, folk, and blues songs throughout his career, performing vocals, lead and bass guitar.

Fuller, with his Fender Stratocaster guitar in photographs and its sound on The Surfaris albums, contributed to the popularity of Leo Fender's instruments.

He is featured on "Hollywood's Rock Walk of Fame".

 he continued to perform with The Surfaris and his other band, “Jim Fuller & The Beatnik” with a fan base in United States, Europe, and Japan.

He died on March 3, 2017, in Arcadia, California, at the age of 69.

Along with the rest of the Surfaris, Fuller was inducted into the Musicians Hall of Fame in 2019.

Best known hits
 "Wipe Out"
 "Point Panic"
 "Surfer Joe"
 "Waikiki Run...."

References

External links
Discogs: Jim Fuller Discography
The Surfaris featuring Jim Fuller — official MySpace site

1947 births
2017 deaths
The Surfaris members
Surf musicians
American rock guitarists
American male guitarists
American rock singers
American rock songwriters
American male singer-songwriters
Musicians from Los Angeles County, California
Singer-songwriters from California
People from Monrovia, California
People from the San Gabriel Valley
Guitarists from California
20th-century American guitarists
20th-century American male musicians